The 1983 Boise State Broncos football team represented Boise State University in the 1983 NCAA Division I-AA football season. The Broncos competed in the Big Sky Conference and played their home games on campus at Bronco Stadium in Boise, Idaho. The Broncos were led by first–year head coach Lyle Setencich, previously the defensive coordinator, Boise State finished the season 6–5 overall and 4–3 in conference.

Schedule

Roster

NFL Draft
One Bronco senior was selected in the 1984 NFL Draft, which lasted twelve rounds (336 selections).

References

External links
 Bronco Football Stats – 1983

Boise State
Boise State Broncos football seasons
Boise State Broncos football